Liu Dawei (born 22 October 1945) is a Chinese painter who is a professor at the People's Liberation Army Academy of Art. He was president of the China Artists Association between 2008 and 2018.

Biography
Liu was born in Weifang, Shandong, on 22 October 1945, while his ancestral home is in Zhucheng. After the establishment of the Communist State, in 1951, his family moved to Baotou. As a child he developed an interesting in painting and studied calligraphy with his grandfather. In September 1963, he was accepted to Inner Mongolia Normal University, majoring in the Department of Arts. After graduating in December 1968, he was despatched to Baotou Semiconductor Device Factory as a fitter. In 1972, he was transferred to Baotou Daily as an art editor and journalist. In September 1978, he was admitted to the Central Academy of Fine Arts, studying paint under Li Keran, Li Kuchan, and Wu Zuoren. He became president of the China Artists Association in 2008, and served until 2018.

He was a member of the 11th National Committee of the Chinese People's Political Consultative Conference.

References

1945 births
Living people
People from Weifang
People's Republic of China painters
Inner Mongolia Normal University alumni
Central Academy of Fine Arts alumni
Members of the 11th Chinese People's Political Consultative Conference